CoScripter (formerly Koala) is a discontinued a browser-based macro recorder developed by IBM Research. Implemented as an extension for the Mozilla Firefox browser, it records user actions and saves them in semi-natural language scripts. The scripts made are saved in a central wiki for sharing with other users. CoScripter aims at end-users through the use of programming by demonstration, a technique to create automated tasks without using a programming language.

See also 

iMacros - Web browser macro recorder, similar to CoScripter. First release 2001.

References

External links 
 Old official site
 Coscrpter @ Allen Cypher site

Free Firefox legacy extensions
IBM software